Constant Camber 26 is a  cruising sloop trimaran sailboat designed in the 1970s by John Marples featuring berths for two adults and two children. The constant camber hull is constructed using a single master template to produce each panel, resulting in a design with unchanging curvature, imparting extraordinary strength similar to an eggshell. The panels are laminated using a vacuum bagging technique, as described in Marples' article, "Backyard Vacuum Bagging," written for WoodenBoat Magazine. A unique and appealing feature, aside from its modular construction, is that her cross arms fold up and in, reducing her beam to just under , making this trimaran fully trailerable.

See also
 List of multihulls

References

Trimarans